The 2020 Canadian Country Music Awards, honouring achievements in Canadian country music in 2019 and 2020, were presented on September 27, 2020. Due to the COVID-19 pandemic in Canada, the event was presented as an outdoor ceremony from the Burl's Creek Event Grounds in Oro-Medonte, Ontario.

Performers included Dean Brody, Brett Kissel, The Reklaws, Dallas Smith, Don Amero, Jade Eagleson, Hunter Brothers, James Barker Band, Carolyn Dawn Johnson, Jojo Mason, Jess Moskaluke, Tebey and Marie-Mai at Burl's Creek, and Lindsay Ell, Carolyn Dawn Johnson, Meghan Patrick, MacKenzie Porter and Tenille Townes performing remotely from Nashville, as well as guest appearances by American country stars Tim McGraw, Kane Brown and Sam Hunt with Breland.

The ceremony was broadcast by the Global Television Network, as well as on several country radio stations owned by Corus Entertainment.

Nominees and winners
Nominations were announced on July 22, 2020.

Music

Radio

Industry

References

2020 in Canadian music
2020 music awards
2020